Patrick Greveraars (born 14 August 1975) is a Dutch football manager who last managed Lommel.

Career

In 2007, Greveraars was appointed youth manager of Portuguese top flight side Porto. In 2016, he was appointed assistant of Shabab Al Ahli in the United Arab Emirates. In 2018, he was appointed assistant manager of Cypriot club Anorthosis.

In 2019, Greveraars was appointed assistant manager of Al Jazira in the United Arab Emirates. In 2021, he was appointed assistant manager of Ghana. In 2022, he was appointed manager of Belgian team Lommel.

References

External links
 Patrick Greveraars at playmakerstats.com

1975 births
Belgian First Division B managers
Dutch expatriate sportspeople in Belgium
Dutch expatriate sportspeople in Cyprus
Dutch expatriate sportspeople in Ghana
Dutch expatriate sportspeople in Portugal
Dutch expatriate sportspeople in the United Arab Emirates
Dutch football managers
Expatriate football managers in Belgium
Expatriate football managers in Cyprus
Expatriate football managers in Ghana
Expatriate football managers in Portugal
Expatriate football managers in the United Arab Emirates
Living people
Lommel S.K. managers
Footballers from Eindhoven